Fu Da-ren (3 April 1933 – 7 June 2018) was a Taiwanese television presenter who received a Golden Bell Award in 1980.

Fu Da-ren was raised in an orphanage established by Soong Mei-ling after his father, Republic of China Army Major General  (1885－1938), was killed in action during the Second Sino-Japanese War.

Several catchphrases familiar to athletes and sports fans in Taiwan were popularized by Fu during his broadcasting career. Fu was Christian.

In later life, Fu was diagnosed with pancreatic cancer, and actively supported euthanasia. His family researched options for assisted suicide, but found that although the End of Life Option Act made the procedure legal in California, no hospital in Los Angeles would accept Fu's medical records. He traveled to Switzerland in November 2017 to join Dignitas, an organization that provides assisted suicide to its members. Days later, Fu chose not to die by euthanasia, and received a visit from Tsai Ing-wen upon his return to Taiwan. In May 2018, Fu flew to Zurich and underwent euthanasia on 7 June 2018, aged 85. Fu's death was filmed. The video was released to Taiwanese media in February 2019, and became viral.

References

1933 births
2018 deaths
Taiwanese television presenters
Deaths by euthanasia
Euthanasia activists
Taiwanese activists
Taiwanese Christians
Association football commentators
Basketball announcers
Baseball announcers
Filmed suicides
Taiwanese men's basketball players
Basketball players at the 1958 Asian Games
Medalists at the 1958 Asian Games
Asian Games medalists in basketball
Asian Games silver medalists for Chinese Taipei
 Suicides in Switzerland
Republic of China men's national basketball team players